Safiabad (also Romanized as Şafīābād) is a village in Abadeh Tashk Rural District, Abadeh Tashk District, Neyriz County, Fars Province, Iran. At the 2006 census, its population was 75, in 17 families.

References 

Populated places in Abadeh Tashk County